Military Information Services (or WSI) was a common name for the Polish military intelligence and counter-intelligence agency. The agency was created in 1990 after the Revolutions of 1989 ended the Communist regime as a merger between the former Communist agencies Internal Military Service (or WSW) and the Second Directorate of General Staff of the Polish Army. The combined agency was originally known as the Second Directorate for Intelligence and Counter-intelligence; it was renamed to WSI in 1991. At first, all commanding and upper-level officers—and most of the employees—had direct personal and career links with the former Communist regimes of Poland and the Soviet Union.

By a vote of 375 - 48 in favor, the Sejm of the Republic of Poland voted in May 2006 to liquidate WSI in October 2006. Polish President Bronisław Komorowski (at that time as deputy) voted against.

History
In 1990, the Second Directorate of General Staff of the Polish Army was joined with military counter-intelligence to form the WSW.  That merger combined the intelligence and counter-intelligence agencies under one structure, the Second Directorate for Intelligence and Counter-intelligence. In 1991, the Second Directorate was transformed into the WSI. WSI was responsible for military counter-intelligence and security activities in Poland.

WSI was bound by law to shield vital state information for the newly independent Poland, under the direct control and management of the Ministry of Defense. WSI was also intended to be Poland's liaison with the intelligence services of other NATO countries.

WSI was to investigate and counteract threats to Poland's defense forces and vital defense information. It also regulated arms, explosives, equipment, licenses, etc.

Disbandment
In 2006, WSI was disbanded and replaced by two independent military intelligence services, the Military Counter-intelligence Service and the Military Intelligence Service. Prime Minister Jarosław Kaczyński appointed conservative politician Antoni Macierewicz to oversee the disbanding of WSI. 

The work of the Verification Commission allowed to reveal the picture of the actual structure of military intelligence services: out of nearly 10,000 operating in 1990 at home and abroad, 2,500 employees of these services are people planted in the central administrative and economic institutions of the country.

According to military experts of the Polish Democratic Left Alliance and Civic Platform, some NATO officials expressed disapproval of disbanding of the WSI.

The Sejm allowed President Lech Kaczyński's administration to publish the Macierewicz Report, a 164-page document detailing the extralegal activities of the WSI that lead to its disbandment. The report documents alleged misconduct by WSI soldiers and employees. Although the first phase of the disbandment was perceived by most of Polish politicians as successful; the new "verification" phase was incomplete. Polish media discuss the ongoing "professionalization" reforms in the Polish army, which, according to politicians, needs radical changes. Nonetheless, there are many public voices of opposition alleging problems in those reforms in spite of verification of WSI. 

Lack of professionals in the new forces replacing the WSI, coupled with their bad performance in 2010s (see for instance the 2010 Polish Air Force Tu-154 crash) improved the public opinions expressed (for instance by the then Polish President Bronisław Komorowski) about the disbanded WSI.

See also 
 UOP
 SB
 CIA
 Warsaw Pact
 GRU
 KGB

Notes

References

External links 
 Macierewicz's report (controversial)

Defunct Polish intelligence agencies
History of Poland (1989–present)
Military of Poland
Military intelligence agencies